Ann Lewis Hamilton is an American television producer and writer. She worked in both capacities on Thirtysomething. She was nominated for two Emmy Awards in 1991 for her work on the show; one for Outstanding Drama Series and one for Outstanding Writing for a Drama Series for her episode "Second Look". She was awarded a Humanitas Prize for her work on the show that year. She went on to work on Party of Five and One Tree Hill. She wrote for Providence and co-wrote episodes of the series with Jennifer M. Johnson. She eventually became a consulting producer for the first season of Grey's Anatomy and won a WGA Award for best new series for her work on the show.

Television credits
Saved (TV series) (executive consultant - 12 episodes) 
thirtysomething  
The Dead Zone
Providence (TV series) (executive producer) 
One Tree Hill (TV series) (executive producer) 
C-16: FBI (TV series) (consulting producer) 
Party of Five (TV series) (co-executive producer - 22 episodes) 
Haven (TV series)
Grey's Anatomy (TV series) 
L.A. Firefighters (TV series) 
The Equalizer (TV series) 
Hard Copy (TV series)

Awards and nominations

External links

American television producers
American women television producers
American television writers
Living people
American women television writers
Writers Guild of America Award winners
Place of birth missing (living people)
Year of birth missing (living people)
21st-century American women